Chioides is a mainly Neotropical genus of skipper butterflies in the family Hesperiidae (Eudaminae)

They range from the south-western United States to Argentina and there are several Antillean endemic species. They are robust and have hindwing "tails".

Species 
The following species are recognised in the genus Chioides:
 Chioides albofasciatus 
 Chioides catillus 
 Chioides churchi 
 Chioides cinereus 
 Chioides concinnus 
 Chioides iverna 
 Chioides ixion 
 Chioides marmorosa 
 Chioides vintra 
 Chioides zilpa

Gallery

References

External links
Images representing Chioides  at Consortium for the Barcode of Life
Funet Taxonomy, distribution

Hesperiidae
Hesperiidae genera
Taxa named by Arthur Ward Lindsey